Julie Pratt (born 20 March 1979) is an English female athlete who competed in the 100 metres hurdles. She has a personal best time of 13.08 seconds.

Athletics career
Pratt competed at the 2002 Commonwealth Games in Manchester, England and the 2006 Commonwealth Games in Melbourne, Australia finishing 6th in both championships.

She was the first ever British athlete to win a gold medal in the 100 metres hurdles at the World Junior Championships, winning in Annecy, France in 1998. This was Britain's first ever gold medal at World or Olympic level in the women's 100 metres hurdles.

She also won a silver medal at the 1999 European Under 23 Championships in Gothenburg, Sweden.

References

1979 births
Living people
British female hurdlers
Athletes (track and field) at the 2002 Commonwealth Games
Athletes (track and field) at the 2006 Commonwealth Games
Commonwealth Games competitors for England